Jouet-sur-l’Aubois is a commune in the Cher department in the Centre-Val de Loire region of France.

Geography

Population

Sights
 The church of St. Germain, dating from the nineteenth century.
 The remains of a 12th-century chapel.
 A medieval motte.
 Some Gallo-Roman remains.
 An old disused factory and forge.

See also
Communes of the Cher department

References

Communes of Cher (department)